Chyby can refer to:

Chyby, Świętokrzyskie Voivodeship
Chyby, Greater Poland Voivodeship